St. Johns Episcopal Church and Cemetery is a historic Episcopal church and cemetery on Montauk Highway on the northeast side, about 300' northwest of the junction with Locust Avenue, Town of Islip in Oakdale, Suffolk County, New York.  The church is a small, rectangular one story building with a gable roof, wood shingle siding, and a simple painted wood exterior trim. It features a three-story, square, engaged tower with a shallow pyramidal roof.  It was enlarged and remodeled about 1843 and restored in 1962; the stained glass window was added in 1873. The cemetery contains about 100 graves with burials dating from the late 18th century to early 20th century.

It was added to the National Register of Historic Places in 1994.

References

External links
St. Johns Episcopal Church and Cemetery Official Website
St. Johns Episcopal Church, Oakdale (Bygone Long Island)

Churches on the National Register of Historic Places in New York (state)
Episcopal church buildings in New York (state)
Anglican cemeteries in the United States
Cemeteries in Suffolk County, New York
Churches completed in 1765
Churches in Suffolk County, New York
18th-century Episcopal church buildings
National Register of Historic Places in Suffolk County, New York